Joseph D. Patero (March 30, 1932 – June 20, 2020) was an American politician who served in the New Jersey General Assembly from 1974 to 1986 and from 1988 to 1991. During the majority of his tenure in the Assembly, he served as chair of the Assembly's Labor Committee.

Born and raised in Manville, Patero attended Bound Brook High School and Rutgers University.

Patero served in the United States Army during the Korean War. He also served in the volunteer fire department and on the Manville Board of Health. He died at his home in Manville on June 20, 2020, at age 88.

References

External links

|-

|-

1932 births
2020 deaths
Bound Brook High School alumni
People from Manville, New Jersey
American firefighters
Military personnel from New Jersey
Democratic Party members of the New Jersey General Assembly
Politicians from Somerset County, New Jersey
Rutgers University alumni